The 1879 New Zealand general election was held between 28 August and 15 September 1879 to elect a total of 88 MPs to the 7th session of the New Zealand Parliament. The Māori vote was held on 8 September. A total of 82,271 (66.5%) European voters turned out to vote, plus 14,553 Māori voters. Following the election, John Hall formed a new government.

Background
Formal political parties had not been established yet; this only happened after the 1890 election. The same 73 electorates were used as for the last election, which was held in 1875–76. In October 1875, Parliament passed the Representation Act 1875, which resolved to increase the size of Parliament to 88 representatives across the 73 electorates.

Two of the electorates were represented by three members each ( and Dunedin. A further eleven electorates were represented by two members each (Auckland West, Grey Valley, City of Nelson, Wanganui and City of Wellington). The remaining 60 electorates were represented by a single member each.

The election came about when George Grey's government was defeated in a no-confidence motion in July. He successfully requested a dissolution from the Governor of New Zealand, Sir Hercules Robinson.

Male Māori received universal suffrage (two years before European males were granted universal suffrage). The parliamentary term was reduced from five to three years.

Date
The election was held between 28 August and 15 September. The date of election is defined here as the day on which the poll took place, or if there was no contest, the day of nomination. The earliest date was the nomination meeting in the  electorate, where William Rolleston was declared elected unopposed.

The election in the Maori electorates were held on 8 September.

Candidates
At the nomination meeting in the  electorate on 5 September 1879, Joseph Shephard, Albert Pitt, Oswald Curtis and Acton Adams were proposed, the latter three without their knowledge or consent, presumably by opponents of George Grey who had the support of Shephard. With Pitt, Curtis and Adams all formally withdrawing from the contest, the returning officer declared Shephard elected unopposed. In 14 seats there was only one candidate.

Result
In the European electorates, the male population over 21 years of age was 116,008. Of those, 82,271 were enrolled and the turnout was 66.5%. The male Māori population was estimated at 14,553, of which 6,686 voted (turnout 46%). The Maori statistics are to be treated with caution, though, as not much emphasis was put into precise data gathering.

The initial results showed a virtual deadlock with no clear winner. Inititially the opposition seemed to have won slightly more seats than the "Greyites" (supporters of Grey) but not enough to claim a majority outright. However, after several days of negotiations a new ministry was formed by John Hall who had ensured support from 45 members, with 41 backing Grey and 2 Independent of either faction. Upon Grey's rejection, James Macandrew was unanimously elected leader of the liberals and sought to oust Hall and form a new ministry, but was denied after Hall induced four Auckland liberals (known as the "Auckland rats") to cross the floor.

George Grey was elected in both the Thames and the City of Christchurch electorates. Grey came first in the three-member Christchurch electorate (Samuel Paull Andrews and Edward Stevens came second with equal numbers of votes, and only 23 votes ahead of Edward Richardson). Richardson petitioned against Grey's return on technical grounds, as Grey had already been elected in the Thames electorate. The electoral commission unseated Grey on 24 October, with Richardson offered to fill this vacancy a few days later. Grey kept the Thames seat and remained a member of parliament through that constituency.

Government formation
Following the election, John Hall formed a new government on 8 October 1879, and Hall thus became the 12th Premier of New Zealand. The Hall Ministry stayed in power until 21 April 1882, i.e. some months after the next general election.

Notes

References